The Panzerkampfwagen E-100 (Gerät 383) (TG-01) was a German super-heavy tank design developed towards the end of World War II. The largest of the Entwicklung series of tank designs intended to improve German armored vehicle production through standardization on cheaper, simpler to build vehicles. 
By the end of the war, the chassis of the prototype E-100 had been partially completed; it was shipped to the United Kingdom for trials, but was later scrapped.

Development

The basic design was ordered by the Waffenamt as a parallel development to the Porsche Maus in June 1943. It was the heaviest of the Entwicklung (E) series of vehicles, meant to standardize as many components as possible, in the 100 ton weight class; other designs were the E-10, E-25, E-50, E-75.

In March 1944, the Adler company in Frankfurt submitted blueprint 021A38300 for a super-heavy tank called E-100, after the tank was proposed in April 1943 along with the other Entwicklung series vehicles. According to the blueprints, the tank would be armed with a both a 150 mm gun and a 75 mm gun. Two types of engines were proposed: one was a 700 hp Maybach HL230, with a transmission and turning mechanism borrowed from the Tiger II. The design had removable side skirts and narrow transport tracks to make rail transport more viable. This design was very similar to the original 'Tiger-Maus' proposal, but had larger  diameter road wheels and a new coil spring based suspension rather than the original torsion bars. A new turret was designed; intended to be simpler and lighter than the Maus turret. But many sources also suggest that a Maus turret could be mounted.

In July 1944 Hitler ordered the development of super heavy tanks to stop. Work on the E-100 continued at a very low priority, with only three Adler employees available to assemble the prototype.

The first prototype was never fully completed and was found by the 751st Field Artillery Battalion of the American forces in April 1945. The partially completed vehicle was taken by the British Army for evaluation and then scrapped in the 1950s.

See also
 List of prototype World War II combat vehicles
 Entwicklung series
 Maus German 188 ton design, superior in terms of armor, but inferior in terms of mobility

Tanks of comparable role, performance and era
 American T30 Heavy Tank
 Soviet IS-7 post-war heavy tank

References

Sources
 Chamberlain, Peter & Doyle, Hilary (1999) "Encyclopedia of German Tanks of World War Two"

External links
 Lost to the Scrapyard, the E-100 | Cursed by Design, ConeOfArc

Super-heavy tanks
World War II tanks of Germany

ru:E-серия#E-100